Arthur Joseph Jones (born January 1, 1948) is an American neo-Nazi, Holocaust denier and perennial candidate. After running unopposed in the primary election, he was the Republican candidate for Illinois's 3rd congressional district in the November 2018 midterm elections, losing to Democrat Dan Lipinski.

Early life and career
Jones was born in Beloit, Wisconsin, to Lillian Jones, a Sunday School teacher and Arthur Joseph Jones Sr., a factory worker and World War II veteran. He graduated from high school in 1967. He joined the United States Army in 1969 and served Vietnam for one year during the Vietnam War. He studied at University of Wisconsin–Whitewater from 1974 and majored in political science and journalism.

Jones is an independent insurance broker who worked in commission sales for large insurance companies for 25 years.

Politics

Affiliations
Jones was a member of the National Socialist White People's Party for eight years and describes himself as a former leader of the American Nazi Party, the NSWPP's former name. He has also been a member of the Populist Party, a far-right political party active in the 1980s and 1990s.

Candidacy
A perennial candidate, Jones has run for various elected offices since 1976, but has never won an office. In that year, Jones unsuccessfully ran for mayor of Milwaukee, Wisconsin. In 1987, he unsuccessfully ran for alderman of the 13th Ward of Chicago. As of 2018, Jones had run for the U.S. House of Representatives as a Republican eight times; in 1984, 1992, 1996, 1998, 2006, 2008, 2012, and 2018. In 1989 Jones had attempted to run for mayor of Chicago, but was denied inclusion on the Republican primary ballot due to issues regarding his candidature petition.

In 2017, Jones declared his intent to run for the Republican nomination for Congress from Illinois's 3rd congressional district in 2018; he was the only declared candidate of that party. His candidacy was repudiated by the Illinois Republican Party and the Republican National Committee. RNC spokesperson Michael Ahrens stated, "We condemn this candidate and his hateful rhetoric in the strongest possible terms". Jones won the primary unopposed on March 20, 2018, and moved on to face Democratic incumbent Dan Lipinski in the general election. Following his primary victory, Republican party officials encouraged members not to vote for Jones. Despite the GOP disavowing him, 26.2 percent of voters still voted for him in the general election on November 6, 2018, as he lost by more than 47 points. When Republicans ran for the seat in the previous ten years they earned 35.4%, 31.5%, 24.3%, and 21.4% of their respective votes.

Jones ran for Congress in Illinois's 3rd congressional district again in 2020 and was described as a "fake Republican" by the party whose nomination he was attempting to gain. One of the party's digital ads ran with the slogan "Say No To The Nazi". He came a poor third in the eventual result of the primaries.

Views
Jones is a white nationalist and Holocaust denier. His 2018 candidate website calls the Holocaust a "racket." He has claimed that the Holocaust was "the biggest, blackest lie in history" and "nothing more than an international extortion racket by the Jews." Jones does not support interracial marriage or integration in public schools. In 1993, Jones was filmed in a fight with Milwaukee Alderman Michael McGee Jr. on The Jerry Springer Show. Jones also “saluted” Nation of Islam leader Louis Farrakhan for his views about Jews, as well as referring to Jews as the enemy.

A neo-Nazi, Jones appears in a photo captioned: "Jones was a guest speaker at the event organized by the Loyal White Knights of the Ku Klux Klan, based in North Carolina"; the image is in a slideshow on his own official candidate website. The same slideshow has another image (captioned "Arthur Jones speaking in Harrisburg Penn., on November 5, 2016") showing him among black-clothed men who hold a National Socialist Movement banner and carry shields marked with the neo-Nazi circle-cross emblem. The same slideshow has an image showing Jones speaking amid Aryan Nations emblems (caption: "Art Jones speaking at the Aryan Nations 2014 World Congress in Converse, La.")

Jones has attended many rallies commemorating Adolf Hitler or supporting white supremacy. Jones considers himself a "white racialist" and has stated "I will work with the [Ku Klux] Klan, with socialists—I exclude communists of course—any patriotic organization that is in general agreement with my beliefs and principles".

In 2016, he was a supporter of Donald Trump for president. Jones said in an interview then, "I agree with a lot of what Mr. Trump has to say [...] He's his own man. I like the fact that doesn't have to go hat in hand to Jewish billionaires to get money". In February 2018, Jones nonetheless said President Trump "surrounded himself with hordes of Jews", and regrets his 2016 vote. At a neo-Nazi meeting in Kentucky, Jones said that Trump "surrounded himself with hordes of Jews including a Jew in his own family, that punk named Jared Kushner", and moved on to say "I'm sorry I voted for the son of a bitch, pardon my English" and that Trump was "nothing but a puppet … this Jew-loving fool", all of which was also captured on video.

According to the Chicago Sun-Times, it takes thousands more signatures to get ballot-approved as an independent candidate than as a Republican; Jones therefore ran in 2016 as a Republican, but the party disavowed him and found technical reasons for removing him from past ballots. Again according to the Sun-Times, Jones took countermeasures in 2017 and 2018 for which the party was unprepared, and so he appeared on their ballot despite official Republican disapproval.

Electoral history

Notes

References

External links
Official candidate website
Official candidate website's Holocaust denying page

1948 births
Living people
American Holocaust deniers
American Nazi Party members
Businesspeople from Chicago
Businesspeople from Milwaukee
Illinois Republicans
Insurance agents
Politicians from Beloit, Wisconsin
Politicians from Chicago
Politicians from Milwaukee
Military personnel from Wisconsin
United States Army soldiers
University of Wisconsin–Whitewater alumni
Candidates in the 2018 United States elections
20th-century far-right politicians in the United States
Neo-Nazi politicians in the United States